Alcyna exigua is a species of sea snail, a marine gastropod mollusk in the family Trochidae, the top snails.

Distribution
This species occurs in the East China Sea

References

 Gould, A. A. 1861. Proc. Boston Soc. Nat. Hist. 8: 18.
 Smithsonian Institution: Elenchus exiguus

exigua
Gastropods described in 1861